The American Council for Quebec Studies was founded in 1981 and consists of academics who study the "histories, literatures, politics, cultures, and languages of Québec, Francophone Canada, and Franco-America." It produces the peer-reviewed academic journal Quebec Studies which is published by Liverpool University Press.

In 2005, the council received the Prix du 3-juillet-1608 of the Conseil supérieur de la langue française in recognition of its services to the French-language community of North America.

List of presidents
 Edwin Hamblet, 1981-1982
 André Sénécal, 1983-1984
 Jeanne Kissner, 1985-1986
 Robert Schwartzwald, 1987-1990
 Robert Gill, 1990-1992
 Jane Moss, 1992-1995
 Richard Beach, 1995-1997
 Emile Talbot, 1997-1999
 Robert Whelan, 1999-2001
 Roseanna L. Dufault, 2001-2003
 Kevin J. Christiano, 2003-2005
 Raymond Pelletier, 2005-2007
 Juliette Rogers, 2007-2009
 David Massell, 2009-2011
 Amy Reid, 2011-2013
 Leslie Choquette, 2013-2015
 Sam Fisher, 2015-2017
 Charles R. Batson, 2017-2019

See also

References

External links

Culture of Quebec
Organizations established in 1981
Learned societies of the United States